Break It Down may refer to:

 "Break It Down" (The Chris Warren Band song)
 "Break It Down", a 1995 song by Malaika from Sugar Time album 
Break It Down (album), a 2014 album by SpeXial

See also
"Break It"
Break It All Down
Break It On Down (disambiguation)
Bring It (disambiguation)